Dewas Senior was established by Tukoji Rao I Puar during the Maratha conquest of Central India. It was a 15 Gun Salute Maratha princely state. On 12 December 1818 it became a British protectorate.

History

The original state was founded in 1728 by Tukoji Rao, from the Puar clan of the Marathas who together with his younger brother Jivaji Rao, had advanced into Malwa with Peshwa Baji Rao I as part of the Maratha Conquest of Malwa. The brothers divided the territory among themselves; their descendants ruled as the senior and junior branches of the family. After 1841, each branch ruled his own portion as a separate state, though the lands belonging to each were intimately entangled; in Dewas, the capital town, the two sides of the main street were under different administrations and had different arrangements for water supply and lighting.

The two Rajas heading Dewas states both lived in separate residences in the town of Dewas, and ruled over separate areas.

From 1907, both Dewas states were in the Malwa Agency of the Central India Agency. After India's independence in 1947, the Maharajas of Dewas acceded to India, and their states were integrated into Madhya Bharat, which became a state of India in 1950. In 1956, Madhya Bharat was merged into Madhya Pradesh state.

Dewas Junior Darbar (Court) was composed of Jagirdars, Sardars, Istamuradars and Mankaris.

Rulers

Rajas
1728 – 16 Nov 1754         Tukoji Rao I Puar                  (b. c.1696 – d. 1754)
16 Nov 1754 – 24 Mar 1789  Krishnaji Rao I Puar               (b. 1740 – d. 1789)
16 Nov 1754 – 1756         Rani Savitribai (f) -Regent
24 Mar 1789 – 28 Sep 1827  Tukoji Rao II Puar                 (b. 1783 – d. 1827)
24 Mar 1789 –  4 Oct 1794  Rani Gangabai (f) -Regent
28 Sep 1827 – 26 Jul 1860  Rukmangad Tukoji Rao Puar          (b. 1821 – d. 1860) "Khasi Sahib"
28 Sep 1827 – 1835         Bhawanibai Raje Sahib (f) -Regent  (d. 1835)
26 Jul 1860 – 12 Oct 1899  Krishnaji Rao II Puar              (b. 1849 – d. 1899) "Baba Sahib"
26 Oct 1860 – 23 Mar 1867  Maharani Yamunabai (f) -Regent     (b. 1829 – d. 1909)
12 Oct 1899 –  1 Jan 1918  Tukoji Rao III Puar  "Kesho Rao"    (b. 1888 – d. 1937) "Bapu Sahib" (from 12 Dec *1911, Sir Tukaji Rao III Puar)

Maharajas
 1 Jan 1918 – 21 Dec 1937  Sir Tukoji Rao III Puar "Kesho Rao (s.a.) Bapu Sahib" (fled to Pondicherry, French India 26 Jul 1934)
21 Dec 1937 – 23 Mar 1947  Vikramsinh Rao I Puar "Nana Sahib"   (b. 1910 – d. 1983) (from 12 Jun 1941, Sir Vikramsinh Rao Puar) (administrator from 26 Jul 1934)
11 Aug 1941 – 15 May 1943  Maharani Pramilabai (f) -Regent    (b. 1910 – d. 2008) (1st time)
23 Mar 1947 – 15 Aug 1947  Maharani Pramilabai (f) -Regent    (s.a.) (2nd time)
23 Mar 1947 – 15 August 1947 Krishnaji Rao III Puar "Aba Sahib" (b.1932 – d. 1999)

Titular Maharajas
15 August 1947 – 21 Jan 1994  Krishnaji Rao III Puar "Aba Sahib"
21 Jan 1994 – 19 June 2015 Tukoji Rao IV Puar (b.1963 – d. 2015)
19 June 2015 – Present     Vikram Singh Rao II Puar             (b.1989 – present)

See also
 Dewas Junior State
 Dhar State
 The Hill of Devi
 List of Maratha dynasties and states
 List of Indian princely states

References

Dhar district
Princely states of Madhya Pradesh
Princely states of Maharashtra
States and territories disestablished in 1948
1728 establishments in India
1948 disestablishments in India
Dewas district
History of Madhya Pradesh